The 1917 Camp Zachary Taylor football team represented Camp Zachary Taylor in college football during the 1917 college football season. Doc Rodes was on the team.

Schedule

References

Camp Zachary Taylor
Camp Zachary Taylor football